The Union of the People for Republic and Integral Development is a political party in the Democratic Republic of Congo. The party won 4 out of 500 seats in the parliamentary elections.

References

Political parties in the Democratic Republic of the Congo